The 2016 Maine State Senate election was held on Tuesday, November 8, 2016, with the primary election being held on June 14, 2016, to elect the 128th Maine Senate. Voters in all 35 districts of the Maine State Senate will elect their senators. The election coincided with the elections for other offices, including for President, U.S. House and the Maine House of Representatives.

Results Summary

Incumbents defeated in primary election
Linda Baker (R-District 23), defeated by Guy Lebida (R)

Incumbents defeated in general election
Chris Johnson (D-District 13), defeated by Dana Dow (R)
John Patrick (D-District 18), defeated by Lisa Keim (R)

Open seats that changed parties
Peter Edgecomb (R-District 1) didn't seek re-election, seat won by Troy Jackson (D)
Michael Willette (R-District 2) didn't seek re-election, seat won by Michael Carpenter (D)
Earle McCormick (R-District 14) didn't seek re-election, seat won by Shenna Bellows (D)
Linda Baker (R-District 23) lost re-nomination, seat won by Eloise Vitelli (D)

Detailed Results

Districts 1-18

District 1
Incumbent Republican Peter Edgecomb has represented the 1st district since 2014. Edgecomb didn't seek re-election. Former Senator Troy Jackson won the open seat.

District 2
Incumbent Republican Michael Willette has represented the 2nd district since 2014. Willette didn't seek re-election. Democrat Michael Carpenter won the open seat.

District 3
Incumbent Republican Rodney Whittemore has represented the 3rd district and its predecessors since 2010.

District 4
Incumbent Republican Paul Davis has represented the 4th district since 2014.

District 5
Incumbent Democrat Jim Dill has represented the 5th district since 2014.

District 6
Incumbent Republican David Burns has represented the 6th district since 2012. Burns didn't seek re-election. State Representative Joyce Maker won the open seat.

District 7
Incumbent Republican Brian Langley has represented the 7th district and its predecessors since 2010.

District 8
Incumbent Republican Kimberly Rosen has represented the 8th district since 2014.

District 9
Incumbent Democrat Geoffrey Gratwick has represented the 9th district and its predecessors since 2012.

District 10
Incumbent Republican Andre Cushing III has represented the 10th district and its predecessors since 2012.

District 11
Incumbent Republican Senate President Michael Thibodeau has represented the 11th district and its predecessors since 2010.

District 12
Incumbent Democrat David Miramant has represented the 12th district since 2014.

District 13
Incumbent Democrat Chris Johnson has represented the 13th district and its predecessors since 2012. Johnson lost re-election to Republican Dana Dow.

District 14
Incumbent Republican Earle McCormick has represented the 14th district since 2014. McCormick didn't seek re-election.

District 15
Incumbent Republican Roger Katz has represented the 15th district and its predecessors since 2010.

District 16
Incumbent Republican Scott Cyrway has represented the 16th district since 2014.

District 17
Incumbent Republican Tom Saviello has represented the 17th district and its predecessors since 2010.

District 18
Incumbent Democrat John Patrick has represented the 18th district and its predecessors since 2010. He lost re-election to Republican Lisa Keim.

Districts 19-35

District 19
Incumbent Republican James Hamper has represented the 19th district and its predecessors since 2012.

District 20
Incumbent Republican Eric Brakey has represented the 20th district since 2014.

District 21
Incumbent Democrat Nate Libby has represented the 21st district since 2014. Libby was unopposed for re-election.

District 22
Incumbent Republican Garrett Mason has represented the 22nd district and its predecessors since 2010.

District 23
Incumbent Republican Linda Baker has represented the 23rd district since 2014. Baker lost re-nomination to fellow Republican Guy Lebida. Former Senator Eloise Vitelli defeated Lebida in the general election.

District 24
Incumbent Democrat Stanley Gerzofsky has represented the 24th district and its predecessors since 2008. Gerzofsky was term-limited. Democrat Everett "Brownie" Carson won the open seat.

District 25
Incumbent Democrat Cathy Breen has represented the 25th district since 2014.

District 26
Incumbent Democrat Bill Diamond has represented the 26th district since 2014.

District 27
Incumbent Democratic Minority Leader Justin Alfond has represented the 27th district and its predecessors since 2008. Alfond was term-limited. State Representative Ben Chipman won the open seat.

District 28
Incumbent Democrat Anne Haskell has represented the 28th district and its predecessors district since 2012. Haskell didn't seek re-election. State Representative Mark Dion won the open seat.

District 29
Incumbent Democrat Rebecca Millett has represented the 29th district since 2012.

District 30
Incumbent Republican Amy Volk has represented the 30th district since 2014.

District 31
Incumbent Democrat Linda Valentino has represented the 31st district and its predecessors since 2012. Valentino didn't seek re-election. State Representative Justin Chenette won the open seat.

District 32
Incumbent Democrat Susan Deschambault has represented the 32nd district since her appointment on April 5, 2016. Deschambault was elected to a full term.

District 33
Incumbent Republican David Woodsome has represented the 33rd district since 2014.

District 34
Incumbent Republican Ronald Collins has represented the 34th district and its predecessors since 2010.

District 35
Incumbent Democrat Dawn Hill has represented the 35th district and its predecessors since 2010.

References

State Senate
Maine State Senate
Maine Senate elections